Jeremy Steig (September 23, 1942 – April 13, 2016) was an American jazz flutist.

Biography
Steig was born in Manhattan, the son of New Yorker cartoonist William Steig and Elizabeth (Mead) Steig, head of the fine arts department at Lesley College.  Steig was a maternal nephew of Margaret Mead and Leo Rosten, and was also the cousin of Mary Catherine Bateson.

Steig also composed the music for animated film adaptations of his father's books for Weston Woods, including The Amazing Bone, Brave Irene and Sylvester and the Magic Pebble.

His song "Howlin' For Judy", from his 1970 album Legwork, was sampled in the Beastie Boys' 1994 single "Sure Shot", providing the main instrumental part of the song.

Steig performed the role of "The Pied Piper", exclusively on flute, in the film Shrek Forever After, based on the character created by his father.

He lived in Japan with his wife Asako.  He died in Yokohama from cancer on April 13, 2016. Four years after his death, Byroad Press published his memoir, Get Me Out of Here, fulfilling his final wish. The book is illustrated with Jeremy's ink drawings and, at his request, contains three final chapters and an epilogue by Asako.

Discography

As leader
 1963: Flute Fever (Columbia) Quartet with Denny Zeitlin
 1968: Jeremy & The Satyrs (Reprise)
 1969: What’s New (Verve) with Bill Evans Trio
 1969: This Is Jeremy Steig (Solid State)
 1970: Legwork (Solid State) 
 1970: Wayfaring Stranger (Blue Note)
 1970: Energy (Capitol)
 1971: An Open Heart - Warriors Of The Rainbow (Akashic Records) with Fantazzi & Friends; a limited edition-private pressing release.
 1974: Monium (Columbia) with Eddie Gómez
 1975: Temple of Birth (Columbia) with Richard Beirach and Johnny Winter
 1976: Leaving (Trio [Japan] Records; reissued on Storyville in 1988) with Richard Beirach
 1976: Outlaws [live] (Enja) with Eddie Gómez
 1977: Firefly (CTI)
 1978: Lend Me Your Ears (Creative Music Productions/CMP) with Eddie Gómez and Joe Chambers
 1979: Music for Flute & Double-Bass (CMP) with Eddie Gómez
 1980: Rain Forest (CMP) with Eddie Gómez
 1992: Jigsaw (Triloka)
 2002: What's New at F (Tokuma [Japan] Records) with Eddie Gómez Quartet
 2003: Jam (Steig-Gomez Records) with Eddie Gómez
 2004: Improvised (Moonbeams Records)
 2005: Flute On The Edge (Steig Music Company)
 2007: Pterodactyl (Steig Music Company)

Compilations and other appearances
 1969: Jazz Wave, Ltd. - On Tour [live] (Blue Note) 2LP set; various artists
 1971: Portrait (United Artists) 2LP compilation of the albums: This Is Jeremy Steig, Legwork and Wayfaring Stranger.
 1972: Fusion (Groove Merchant) 2LP set; reissue of Energy, with a second album (=7 tracks) of previously unreleased material.
 1973: Mama Kuku [live] (MPS/BASF Records) with Association P.C.
 1974: Flute Summit - Jamming At Donaueschingen Music Festival (Atlantic) with James Moody, Sahib Shihab, Chris Hinze
 2008: Howlin' For Judy (Blue Note's "Rare Grooves" series) CD compilation of the albums: Legwork and Wayfaring Stranger.

As sideman
With Walter Bishop, Jr. Trio
Illumination (Denon [Japan] Records, 1977)
With Tommy Bolin
From The Archives - Vol. 1 (Rhino Records, 1996) a collection of "grade-A" previously unreleased "rock-jazz-fusion" material.
From The Archives - Volume 2 (Zebra Records, 1998) another collection of previously unreleased material; even better than the first volume.
With Hank Crawford
Hank Crawford's Back (Kudu, 1976)
Tico Rico (Kudu/CTI, 1977)
With Art Farmer
Crawl Space (CTI, 1977)
With Urbie Green
The Fox (CTI, 1976)
With Mike Mainieri
Journey Thru an Electric Tube (Solid State, 1968)
With Idris Muhammad
Turn This Mutha Out (Kudu/CTI, 1977)
Boogie To The Top (Kudu/CTI, 1978)
With Lalo Schifrin
Towering Toccata (CTI, 1976)
With Peter Walker
Rainy Day Raga (Vanguard, 1966)
With Johnny Winter
Still Alive and Well (Columbia, 1973)
Saints & Sinners (Columbia, 1974) note: Jeremy plays on "Dirty", a previously unreleased instrumental track recorded for but left-off the original album release; it is included on the CD reissue.
With Paul Winter Sextet
Jazz Meets The Folk Song (Columbia, 1964)
With Montreal
A Summer's Night (Stormy Forest, 1970)

References

External links
Tribute page to Jeremy Steig on his official web site
 Celeste Sutherland, "Jeremy Steig", All About Jazz, April 17, 2004

Discogs entry

Fiorello H. LaGuardia High School alumni
Jazz fusion musicians
American jazz flautists
1942 births
2016 deaths
Blue Note Records artists
Musicians from New York City
Plastic Ono Band members
Jazz musicians from New York (state)
Columbia Records artists
Solid State Records artists
CTI Records artists